Susan Ellen "Zoe" Lofgren (born December 21, 1947) is an American lawyer and politician serving as a U.S. representative from California. A member of the Democratic Party, Lofgren is in her 13th term in Congress, having been first elected in 1994. Lofgren has long served on the House Judiciary Committee, and has chaired the House Administration Committee since the beginning of the 116th Congress.

Lofgren was the 16th district's first female U.S. representative, before part of the district was redistricted into the 19th congressional district. The district covers much of Santa Clara County, including Gilroy, Morgan Hill, and most of San Jose. Representing a district covering much of Silicon Valley, Lofgren has been noted for her activity in tech-related policy areas such as net neutrality and digital surveillance.

Early life, education and career
Lofgren was born in San Mateo, California, the daughter of Mary Violet, a school cafeteria employee, and Milton R. Lofgren, a beer truck driver. Her grandfather was Swedish. Lofgren attended Gunn High School (1966) in Palo Alto, and while in high school, Lofgren was a member of the Junior State of America, a student-run political debate, activism, and student governance organization. She earned her B.A. degree in political science from Stanford University in 1970 and her Juris Doctor degree from Santa Clara University School of Law in 1975.

After graduating from Stanford, Lofgren worked as a House Judiciary Committee staffer for Congressman Don Edwards when the committee prepared articles of impeachment against President Richard Nixon during the impeachment process against Nixon.

In 1978, Lofgren married John Marshall Collins. Returning to San Jose, she worked in Don Edwards's district office while earning her J.D. degree. After two years as partner at a San Jose immigration law firm, she was elected to the board of San Jose City College. In 1981, she was elected to the Santa Clara County Board of Supervisors, representing downtown San Jose and nearby communities, where she served for 13 years.

U.S. House of Representatives

Elections
In 1994, Lofgren entered a six-way Democratic primary in what was then the 16th district, when Edwards retired after 32 years in Congress. The district, then as now, is a Democratic stronghold, and it was understood that whoever won the Democratic primary would be only the second person to represent this district since its creation in 1963 (it was numbered as the 9th district from 1963 to 1975, as the 10th from 1975 to 1993, the 16th from 1993 to 2013, and has been the 19th since 2013). A decided underdog, she managed to defeat the favorite, former San Jose mayor Tom McEnery, by just over 1,100 votes. She breezed to victory in November, and has since been reelected with no substantive opposition.

During the 2004, 2006 and 2008 elections, Lofgren's campaign paid approximately $350,000 to two businesses her husband operates: Collins and Day and John Marshall Collins P.C. over a six-year period to support campaign efforts.

Tenure

Lofgren chairs the 46-member California Democratic Congressional Delegation. She serves on the Judiciary Committee and chairs the House Judiciary Subcommittee on Immigration, Citizenship, Refugees, Border Security, and International Law. In 2007, she co-sponsored the Violent Radicalization and Homegrown Terrorism Prevention Act, which the ACLU characterized as "legislating against thought". In April 2011, she became the first member of Congress to call for federal investigation into the Secure Communities deportation program.

Beginning in 2009, Lofgren served as chair of the House Ethics Committee. In doing so, she presided over a rare sanction of censure, against longtime member Charles B. Rangel. In 2009, Lofgren was appointed and served as an impeachment manager in the impeachment trial of Judge Samuel B. Kent. In 2010, Lofgren was appointed and served as an impeachment manager (prosecutor) in the impeachment trial of Judge Thomas Porteous.

In the Stop Online Piracy Act House Judiciary Committee hearings, she defended the current state of the internet in opposition of the bill. She has also opposed the data retention requirements in the H.R. 1981 (the Protecting Children from Internet Pornographers Act of 2011).

In February 2013, Lofgren became one of the sponsors of the Fair Access to Science and Technology Research Act to expedite open access to taxpayer-funded research.

In May 2016, Lofgren was publicly reprimanded during a House Judiciary Committee hearing after calling witness Gail Heriot of the United States Commission on Civil Rights an "ignorant bigot" because Heriot's written testimony before the hearing had suggested that calling oneself a female does not cause one to be a female. Following the oral warning from acting committee chairman Steve King, Lofgren responded, "I cannot allow that kind of bigotry to go into the record unchallenged".

In January 2020, Lofgren was selected as one of seven impeachment managers who presented the impeachment case against President Donald Trump during his first trial before the United States Senate. This marked her third time serving as an impeachment manager.

As of October 2021, Lofgren had voted in line with Joe Biden's stated position 100% of the time.

Committee assignments
 Committee on House Administration (Chair)
 Subcommittee on Oversight (Ranking Member, 112th Congress)(Defunct subcommittee)
 Committee on the Judiciary
 Subcommittee on Intellectual Property, Competition, and the Internet
 Subcommittee on Immigration and Citizenship (Chair, 117th Congress)
 Committee on Science, Space and Technology (Ranking Member)
 Subcommittee on Space and Aeronautics
Select Committee on the Modernization of Congress
Select Committee on the January 6 Attack

Caucuses
 Congressional Asian Pacific American Caucus (Associate member)
Congressional Progressive Caucus
Congressional Arts Caucus
Afterschool Caucuses
Congressional NextGen 9-1-1 Caucus
Congressional Freethought Caucus
Medicare for All Caucus

Political positions

Abortion

Lofgren is pro-choice and has a 100% rating from NARAL Pro-Choice America, an organization that advocates for abortion rights and tracks congressional records on the topic. In 2013, she was chosen as the lead House Democrat to argue against the Pain-Capable Unborn Child Protection Act, which would have banned abortions after the mother was 20 weeks pregnant. Lofgren said, "Passage of the bill is wrong. It's the wrong policy for the freedom of American women." She opposed the overturning of Roe v. Wade, calling it "a bleak day" and vowing to keep abortion safe and accessible in California.

Tech policy 
Lofgren, whose district covers much of Silicon Valley, has been noted for her activity in tech industry regulation and privacy policy. In 2012, she was one of two Democrats in Congress to oppose the Federal Trade Commission's (FTC) then-ongoing antitrust probe of Google. Lofgren criticized the European Commission's decision to fine Google $2.7 billion in 2017 over alleged anti-competitive behavior, arguing that the fine was "unfair to the U.S. companies participating in European markets".

In 2013, in the wake of the prosecution and subsequent suicide of Internet activist Aaron Swartz (who used a script to download scholarly research articles in excess of what JSTOR terms of service allowed), Lofgren introduced a bill, Aaron's Law to exclude terms of service violations from the 1986 Computer Fraud and Abuse Act and from the wire fraud statute. By May 2014, Aaron's Law had stalled in committee. Brian Knappenberger, author of a documentary on Swartz, alleges this occurred due to Oracle Corporation's financial interest in maintaining the status quo.

In 2021, Lofgren opposed a series of bipartisan proposals aiming to "break up" Big Tech companies through antitrust enforcement. Alongside a group of other members of the California congressional delegation, she criticized the "antitrust package" due to concerns about its impact on the U.S. tech industry. Following allegations that Lofgren's opposition to antitrust measures were potentially influenced by her daughter's employment as a corporate counsel for Google, Lofgren was defended by colleagues Ro Khanna and Anna Eshoo, who called these criticisms "ad hominem attacks".

In 2022, Lofgren was one of 16 Democrats to vote against the Merger Filing Fee Modernization Act of 2021, an antitrust package that would crack down on corporations for anti-competitive behavior.

Energy policy

Lofgren has routinely voted for bills that would expand renewable energy investments. She believes that a clean energy infrastructure is required to curb the effects of climate change. In 2018, Lofgren co-sponsored the Nuclear Energy Innovation Capabilities Act. In February 2019, she co-sponsored the Green New Deal resolution (H.Res. 109).

Health care

Lofgren is a member of the Medicare for All Caucus and co-sponsored the legislation introduced by Representative John Conyers in 2017. She rescinded her sponsorship of a similar bill introduced by Representative Pramila Jayapal in 2019, arguing that the bill's two-year timeline was not feasible. Lofgren continues to support a public option for health insurance, and 2021 co-sponsored Jayapal's bill to lower the Medicare eligibility age from 65 to 60.

Net neutrality 
Lofgren is a supporter of net neutrality policies to prevent internet service providers (ISPs) from engaging in data discrimination. In 2018, she signed a discharge petition to force a vote on net neutrality protections in Congress.

Electoral history

California's 16th congressional district

California's 19th congressional district 

|- class="vcard"
| style="background-color: #3333FF; width: 2px;" |
| class="org" style="width: 130px" | Democratic
| class="fn"    | Zoe Lofgren (incumbent)
| style="text-align:right;" | 97,096
| style="text-align:right;" | 99.0
|-
|- class="vcard"
| style="background-color: #E81B23; width: 2px;" |
| class="org" style="width: 130px" | Republican
| class="fn"    | Justin James Aguilera (write-in)
| style="text-align:right;" | 792
| style="text-align:right;" | 0.8
|-
|- class="vcard"
| style="background-color: #E81B23; width: 2px;" |
| class="org" style="width: 130px" | Republican
| class="fn"    | Karl Ryan (write-in)
| style="text-align:right;" | 160
| style="text-align:right;" | 0.2
|-
|- class="vcard"
| style="background-color: ; width: 2px;" |
| class="org" style="width: 130px" | American Independent
| class="fn"    | Robert Ornelas (write-in)
| style="text-align:right;" | 7
| style="text-align:right;" | 0.0
|-

|- class="vcard"
| style="background-color: #3333FF; width: 5px;" |
| class="org" style="width: 130px" | Democratic 
| class="fn" | Zoe Lofgren (incumbent) 
| style="text-align: right; margin-right: 0.5em" |  
| style="text-align: right; margin-right: 0.5em" | 73.8 
|-
|- class="vcard"
| style="background-color: #E81B23; width: 2px;" |
| class="org" style="width: 130px" | Republican
| class="fn"    | Justin James Aguilera
| style="text-align:right;" | 57,823
| style="text-align:right;" | 26.2
|-

Personal life

In 1978, Lofgren married John Marshall Collins, an attorney. The couple met at an election party. They have two children and twin grandsons. Lofgren's daughter, Sheila Collins, is a corporate counsel at Google.

See also
 PROTECT IP Act
 Aaron's Law
 Women in the United States House of Representatives

References

External links

 Congresswoman Zoe Lofgren official U.S. House website
 Zoe Lofgren for Congress

|-

|-

|-

|-

|-

|-

|-

1947 births
21st-century American politicians
21st-century American women politicians
American people of Swedish descent
American women lawyers
California lawyers
County supervisors in California
Female members of the United States House of Representatives
Living people
Democratic Party members of the United States House of Representatives from California
People from Palo Alto, California
People from San Mateo, California
Politicians from San Jose, California
Santa Clara University School of Law alumni
Stanford University alumni
United States congressional aides
Women in California politics
Gunn High School alumni